The ancient Perusia, now Perugia, first appears in history as one of the 12 confederate cities of Etruria. It is first mentioned in the account of the war of 310 or 309 BC between the Etruscans and the Romans. It took, however, an important part in the rebellion of 295 BC and was reduced, with Vulsinii and Arretium (Arezzo), to seek for peace in the following year.

It seems the city was in the Antonii's clientela since this period, as it was said by historians during imperial times.

In 216 BC and 205 BC it assisted Rome in the Hannibalic war, but afterward it is not mentioned until 41–40 BC, when Lucius Antonius took refuge there and was reduced by Octavian after a long siege, known as the Perusine War. 
Some of the refugees ran away towards Gaul to escape Octavian. A local history said they were the founders of Perouges en Dauphiné Province (France).

A number of lead bullets used by slingers have been found in and around the city. The city was burnt, we are told, with the exception of the temples of Vulcan and Juno — the massive Etruscan terrace-walls, naturally, can hardly have suffered at all — and the town, with the territory for a mile round, was allowed to be occupied by whoever chose. It must have been rebuilt almost at once, for several bases exist, inscribed Augusta sacr(um) Perusia restituta; but, as we have seen, it did not become a colony until AD 251–253.

References

Etruscan cities
Etruscan sites
Roman sites of Umbria
Perugia